The Kiskiminetas River (commonly referred to as the Kiski by locals) is a tributary of the Allegheny River, approximately  long, in Western Pennsylvania in the United States. The region stretching from the northern side of Harmar Township, Pennsylvania to the Kiskiminetas towns is often referred to by the locals as the Alle-Kiski Valley after the rivers.

Course 

The Kiskiminetas River is formed at Saltsburg, on the border between Westmoreland and Indiana counties, by the confluence of the Conemaugh River and Loyalhanna Creek. It flows northwest in a meandering course past Avonmore, Apollo, Vandergrift, Hyde Park and Leechburg.

The Kiski-Conemaugh watershed includes much of the historic coal-producing region of Western Pennsylvania. The water quality is considered degraded by numerous abandoned mine drainages in its upper reaches and tributaries, leading to on-going efforts by federal, state, and private agencies to improve the water quality of the river. The Kittanning Path, a major trail in the region used by Native Americans and early European settlers, crossed the river at a ford near present-day Leechburg.

Political subdivisions
The course of the Kiskiminetas River traverses the following political subdivisions, named in order of encounter traveling downstream.

Saltsburg
Loyalhanna Township, Westmoreland County
Conemaugh Township, Indiana County
Kiskiminetas Township, Armstrong County
Bell Township, Westmoreland County
Apollo
Allegheny Township, Westmoreland County
East Vandergrift
Vandergrift
Parks Township, Armstrong County
Leechburg
West Leechburg
Gilpin Township, Armstrong County

Tributaries 

(Mouth at the Allegheny River)

Elder Run
Penn Run
Brady Run
Guffy Run
Carnahan Run
Pine Run
Beaver Run
Roaring Run
Rattling Run (also called Jackson's Run)
Flat Run
Wolford Run
Long Run
Sulphur Run
Blacklegs Creek
Big Run
Marshall Run
Harpers Run
Nesbit Run
Hooper Run
Whisky Run
Loyalhanna Creek
Conemaugh River

Blacklegs Creek

Etymology 

There is no definite interpretation of the origin of the name. It may come from a Native American phrase Kithanne, meaning "Place of the largest stream." According to regional historians in the area, the name has historically had several other possible meanings, including: "river of the big fish" and "plenty of walnuts." Robert Walker Smith in his "History of Armstrong County, Pennsylvania" (Chicago: Waterman, Watkins & Co., 1883) reported that John Heckewelder (a Moravian writer, explorer, and historian who wrote about the Lenape and other tribes in Western Pennsylvania in the 18th century) claimed that the name is "corrupted from Gieschgumanito, signifying, make daylight. In this case, the etymology is: Gisch-gu---day; gisch-que---today; gieschapen---it is daybreak; manitoon---to make. It was probably the word of command, given by a warrior to his comrades at night to break up camp and resume the journey, or war-path." Smith also described another possible meaning from another source: "It is said in McCullough's Narrative, that the Indians called this river Kee-ak-ksheman-nit-toos, signifying 'cut spirit'." Smith noted that he preferred Heckewelder's definition. It is also possible that "Kiskiminetas" means "clear, clean stream of many bends."

See also 
 List of crossings of the Kiskiminetas River
 List of rivers of Pennsylvania
 List of tributaries of the Allegheny River

References

External links

 U.S. Geological Survey: PA stream gaging stations
 Kiskiminetas meaning

 
Rivers of Pennsylvania
Tributaries of the Allegheny River
Rivers of Westmoreland County, Pennsylvania
Rivers of Armstrong County, Pennsylvania
Rivers of Indiana County, Pennsylvania